The Explorers and Early Colonists of Victoria is a historical photographic montage of 1872 by Thomas Foster Chuck (1826–1898). It consists of a framed collection of 713 photographs of the early settlers of Victoria.

History
The project took Chuck three years to complete. To be eligible for inclusion in the montage, the settler must have arrived in Victoria before 1843. To obtain the photos, Chuck photographed some of the surviving settlers, borrowed negatives of others and copied them and photographed portraits and paintings of the more famous. 

The original framed photograph is 1.5 metres high and 1.2 metres wide. It was presented to the State Library of Victoria in 1872 is still held by them. Later Chuck made smaller copies 49 cm by 43 cm for sale to the public (see photo at right) with an accompanying index of the names and dates of arrival of those in the montage.

List of names in the montage

References

External links
 State Library of Victoria

Settlers of Victoria (Australia)
Australian photographs
Black-and-white photographs
Lists of 19th-century people
Lists of men
Lists of people from Victoria (Australia)
1870s photographs
1872 works